The Schwarze See (literal translation: black lake) is a lake in Schlemmin, Rostock, Mecklenburg-Vorpommern, Germany. At an elevation of 108.3 m, its surface area is 0.21 km².

Lakes of Mecklenburg-Western Pomerania